Sir Edward Barkham, 1st Baronet of South Acre (15912 August 1667) was an English politician who sat in the House of Commons in 1625 and 1626.

Barkham was the son of Sir Edward Barkham. He matriculated at King's College, Cambridge in spring 1611 and was awarded BA in 1613 on the visit of Prince Charles. He was admitted at Lincoln's Inn on 13 February 1614. He was knighted in 1623 and then created a baronet in the Baronetage of England on 26 June 1623. In 1625 he was elected Member of Parliament for Boston. He was re-elected MP for Boston in 1626. In 1635 he became High Sheriff of Norfolk.

Barkham died at Tottenham then in Middlesex at the age of 72. He was succeeded by his son Sir Edward Barkham, 2nd Baronet.

References

1591 births
1667 deaths
Baronets in the Baronetage of England
High Sheriffs of Norfolk
English MPs 1625
English MPs 1626
People from Breckland District